Prince Mahmud (Born: 17 July) a popular lyricist, composer and music director of Bangladesh. He has been writing and composing songs for solo and joint albums of band artists in Bangladesh since the 90's. Multiple songs written and composed by him have gained wide popularity. His mixed album ‘Shakti’ (1995) propelled his journey as a composer of mixed albums, which immediately garnered him a massive success Including solo, dual and mixed 'Nimantran' is his 40th album.

Birth and education 
Prince Mahmud was born in Khulna district. He has studied Honors and Masters in Bengali.

Career 
Prince started band music when he was a school student. He was the vocalist for a band called The Blues. After college life, he concentrated on creating songs. He began song composition and writing spontaneously. In the early 90's, Prince Mahmud himself formed a band called From the West. The song released by this band ‘Razakar Albadar Kishui Raibo Nare’ along with positive critical acclamations.

Later, he started working on a band mixed album. His mixed album ‘Shakti’ (1995) propelled his journey as a composer of mixed albums. He used to do mixed albums with all the popular band stars of the country. Those albums touched the highest peak of success. His most popular tracks include ‘Aaj jonmodin tomar’ (Shafin Ahmed); ‘Jodi himaloy hoye’, ‘Hoyni jabar bela’ (Khalid); ‘Bangladesh’, ‘Maa’, ‘Guru’, 'Baba' (James); Eto koshto keno bhalobashay (Hasan) and more.

Albums 

Sesh Dekha - (Band Mix)
Ekhono Du Chokhe Bonna - (Band Mix)
Deyal Dui Hridoyer Majhe - (Band Mix)
Khoma - (Band Mix)
Chuti - (Band Mix)
Harjit - (Band Mix)
Dohon Shudhu Tomar Jonno - (Band Mix)
Baro Mash - (Band Mix)
Devi - (Band Mix)
Shokti - (Band Mix)
Srot - (Band Mix)
Taal - (Solo For Hasan)
Bondona - (Solo For Mahadi)
Boka - (Mix Of Close Up-1 Artist)
Ghumao - (Solo For Khalid)
Jontrona
Piano (Duet of James & Aiyub Bacchu)
Brihospoti
Ghrina
Mehedi Ranga Haat - (Band Mix)
Daag Theke Jai - (Band Mix)
Nirbachita - (Mix)
Oporajeeta
Dese Valobasa Nai
Nimontron - (Mix)
Valobasa Mane Dukkho (For Hasan)
Hello Kosto (For Hasan)
</div>

Awards 
 Citycell-Channel i Music Awards

References 

Bangladeshi composers
Living people
Bangladeshi lyricists
People from Khulna District
Year of birth missing (living people)